Reuven Agami (born 16 December 1965) is a Dutch cancer researcher. He is a professor of Oncogenomics at Erasmus University Rotterdam and head of the section of Oncogenomics at the  Netherlands Cancer Institute-Antoni van Leeuwenhoekziekenhuis.

Career
Agami was born in Herzliya Israel on 16 December 1965. He studied medical biology at the University of Tel Aviv. Agami subsequently moved to the  Weizmann Institute of Science (WIS) in Israel to obtain his Master's degree in the Department of Biophysics studying spliced leader RNA in  Leishmania parasites. Subsequently, he moved to the Department of Molecular Genetics at the WIS where he obtained his Ph.D. in 1999 under Yosef Shaul with a thesis titled: “Cell cycle and apoptosis control induced by the tyrosine kinase c-Abl”. Agami then moved to the Netherlands and was a post-doc under René Bernards at the Netherlands Cancer Institute-Antoni van Leeuwenhoekziekenhuis to study p53-independent DNA damage responses.

From 2001 to 2005 Agami was an assistant professor at the Division of Tumor Biology Netherlands Cancer Institute-Antoni van Leeuwenhoekziekenhuis. His research brought together his expertise in RNA and cancer by developing new technologies in  RNA interference (RNAi) and  microRNAs (miRNAs).

From 2005 to 2008 Agami was appointed associate professor at the Division of Tumor Biology Netherlands Cancer Institute-Antoni van Leeuwenhoekziekenhuis. In this period, he further expanded his scientific interest to the regulation of miRNA function by RNA binding proteins.

From 2008 to 2013 Agami became the head of the Division of Gene Regulation at the Netherlands Cancer Institute-Antoni van Leeuwenhoekziekenhuis. During this period, he broadened his scientific interest in the regulation of gene expression by Alternative polyadenylation (APA).

From 2013 to 2017 Agami was heading the Division of Gene Regulation at the Netherlands Cancer Institute-Antoni van Leeuwenhoekziekenhuis. With the development of Ribosome profiling and  CRISPR-Cas9 technologies, he further studied transcriptional Enhancers and mRNA translation, mostly focusing on enhancerRNAs and predicting metabolic changes in cancer.

Since 2017 Agami is heading the Division of Oncogenomics at the Netherlands Cancer Institute-Antoni van Leeuwenhoekziekenhuis where he investigates mistakes made during mRNA translation when cancer cells experience specific amino acid deficiencies. He aims at utilizing these findings to improve cancer immunotherapy of resistant tumors.

Since 2008 Agami is also a full Professor at the Department of Molecular Genetics at Erasmus Medical Centre Rotterdam University, The Netherlands.

Research
Agami is known for his work utilizing RNA-based and functional genomics technologies in cancer research. He was the inventor of pSUPER, a plasmid-based suppression of gene expression, miRVec, a vector-based expression of miRNAs, and the expression of aberrant proteins due to Ribosomal frameshift and substitutants following IDO1-mediated Interferon gamma-induced tryptophan depletion of cancer cells by T cell attack. His research greatly contributed to the fields of miRNAs, RNA binding proteins, Alternative cleavage and polyadenylation, non-coding RNAs, and mRNA translation. His recent work on aberrant peptides holds the potential to develop immunotherapeutic approaches to treat cancer.

Honors and distinctions
In 1999, Agami was awarded a  European Molecular Biology Organization (EMBO) long-term fellowship in 1999, 
an EMBO Young investigator program (EMBO-YIP) award. in 2004, and was elected an EMBO member in 2008.
In 2001, Agami was awarded the Netherlands Cancer Institute-Antoni van Leeuwenhoekziekenhuis Prize  for his contributions in the field of p53-independent DNA damage responses. 
In 2004, he was elected a member of the young Dutch royal academy of science (DJA-KNAW). During his scientific career, Agami was awarded the European young investigator (EURYI) award in 2004.
In 2007 Agami was the winner of the Dr. Joseph Steiner Prize for his contributions in the field of small RNAs and Cancer. Further, he received VIDI and VICI awards from  Dutch Research Council(NWO) in 2004 and 2011, respectively
ERC-starting award in 2008, ERC-advanced in 2012, and 2018
In 2010 Agami was awarded the European Society for Clinical Investigation (ESCI) Prize for his contributions in the field of miRNAs and cancer. 
In 2016 Agami was nominated a member of the Academia Europaea. In 2017 he was elected a member of Oncode Institute

References

External links
 

Academic staff of Erasmus University Rotterdam

Living people

1965 births
Cancer researchers
Tel Aviv University alumni
Weizmann Institute of Science alumni
People from Herzliya